The Pantagraph is a daily newspaper that serves Bloomington–Normal, Illinois, along with 60 communities and eight counties in the Central Illinois area. Its headquarters are in Bloomington and it is owned by Lee Enterprises. The name is derived from the Greek words "panta" and "grapho," which has a combined meaning of "write all things."

History
Bloomington businessman Jesse W. Fell founded the newspaper on January 14, 1837, making it the oldest-running business in McLean County, though the business lapsed during 1839-1845. W. O. Davis and his heirs owned the Pantagraph for many years until selling the paper to Chronicle Publishing Company in 1980. The paper was purchased by Pulitzer from Chronicle Publishing Company in 1999; Lee Enterprises bought Pulitzer in 2005.

The paper was originally called The Bloomington Observer and McLean County Advocate. Through the years, the newspaper went through several name changes, such as The Whig, The Intelligencer, The Daily Pantagraph, The Pantagraph in 1985, just Pantagraph in 2006, changing back to The Pantagraph in 2008.

Operations
The Pantagraph was a news partner of WEEK-TV, which is situated in East Peoria, Illinois.

The paper is one of the largest newspapers in terms of circulation in the area. The Pantagraph was the only morning newspaper in east central Illinois until The News-Gazette in nearby Champaign switched to a morning publication in June 2009.

References

External links
 
 
 Illinois Digital Newspaper Collections: Daily Pantagraph (1901)

1837 establishments in Illinois
Daily newspapers published in the United States
Lee Enterprises publications
Newspapers published in Bloomington–Normal
Publications established in 1837